is a fictional character from the 2010 video game Ghost Trick: Phantom Detective. He was based on designer Shu Takumi's real dog.

Concept and appearances
Missile was designed by Shu Takumi, the designer of Ghost Trick: Phantom Detective, which is also the only appearance he has made so far, other than a brief cameo in Phoenix Wright: Ace Attorney, where he's a police dog under the care of Dick Gumshoe. In a remake of Ghost Trick for the iPad, he stars in a mini-game called "Missile Omikuji", where he tells fortunes to players in his "enthusiastic" style. Missile is a Pomeranian with thick fur of two colours: brown and white. He is very excitable, reacting to loud noises and strangers by barking at them; in the case of people, he barks at them as a way of greeting them. However, he is also very loyal, doing anything in his power to protect his owners Lynne and Kamila.

He first appears having been shot by an assassin who was waiting for Lynne to come home along with Kamila tied up. However, intervention from Sissel, who turns time back by four minutes to protect Kamila and Missile from this assassin results in him both surviving but being able to communicate with Sissel and other dead people. After Kamila is asked by Lynne to bring her something, Sissel also departs, suggesting that Missile go and try to protect her. While Missile is chasing after Kamila, a kidnapper kills him by accidentally running into him on a motor scooter. While Missile had no special ghost powers the first time he died, he gains access to a power that allows him to swap objects of the same shape, using this to save Kamila, but inadvertently kills another person, who the two of them save. It is later revealed that he gained these powers from dying near a meteor that had crashed in that area years ago, which gives special powers to those that die near it.

Instead of allowing Sissel to undo his death, Missile chooses to stay as a ghost, enjoying the increased ability to protect Kamila and Lynne. After he and Sissel saves the person he inadvertently killed, he is whisked away by the wind while possessing a leaf. He later resurfaces, still in the form of a leaf, and is saved by Sissel, and teams up with Sissel yet again in a mutual agreement for their own benefit. After using his powers to protect his loved ones, he eventually goes with Sissel and a man named Yomiel to 10 years in the past, where the events of Ghost Trick were first brought to fruition. Missile aides in changing the fate of Yomiel, who instead of dying and becoming effectively immortal from the meteor that fell, is possessed by the future Yomiel's spirit, and saves Lynne from death, a girl who he was using as a hostage moments earlier. After Sissel learns his true identity as a cat, Sissel returns to his place of death, meeting with a ghost named Ray who possessed a lamp and helped him out. He reveals himself to be a much older Missile, who had traveled 10 years into the past after failing to protect Lynne and Kamila from the assassin and Yomiel. He eventually came across Sissel who had just recently died, and attempted to form an agreement; however, because Sissel was only looking out for himself, he was forced to try again and trick him into believing that he only had until dawn of the next day before his spirit disappeared, and that he would help him recover his memories. In the end, the events of Ghost Trick are undone, creating an alternate timeline.

Reception
Since appearing in Ghost Trick: Phantom Detective, Missile has received overwhelmingly positive reception. Series creator Shu Takumi noted that, even more so than protagonist Sissel, Missile is the one who gained the most positive response in Japan. The Telegraphs Tom Hoggins called Missile "one of gaming’s sweetest and most endearing characters against all odds." GamesRadar's Carolyn Gudmundson called Missile "possibly the cutest, most loveable dog we've ever seen in a game". GamesRadar's staff further placed him at number 23 in a list of the 50 best game characters of the generation, commenting that "Missile is quite possibly the best dog in gaming". Video Gamer's Martin Gaston called him charming, citing him as a particular highlight of the cast. Game Revolution's KevinS noted that without Missile, the animation would not be enough to carry the game.

1UP.com's Justin Haywald called Missile "one of the most absolutely adorable characters in any game, ever, anywhere", commenting that Ghost Trick changed him from wanting a Welsh Corgi or a Pug to a Pomeranian. Siliconera editor Spencer presented a contrast between Missile and game protagonist Sissel – where Sissel takes the situation of Missile's death seriously, Missile accepts that he is dead by rationalizing that he, as a dog, doesn't know a lot of things. Adventure Gamers' Dante Kleinberg described him as "cute and cuddly", while also using his death as an example of the darker elements found in Ghost Trick. GamesTM, while finding some fault in the game's structure, noted the interaction between Sissel and Missile as "amusing a concept as it is bizarre".

Notes

References

Adventure game characters
Capcom characters
Fictional dogs
Ghost characters in video games
Ghost Trick: Phantom Detective
Male characters in video games
Telepath characters in video games
Video game characters introduced in 2010